This is a list of heads of the Russian Orthodox Church.

Metropolitan of Kiev and all Rus

Kiev Metropolitanate (988–1441) 
 St. Michael I (988–992)
 Leontius (992–1008)
 Theophilact (1008 – until 1018)
 John I (1008/18 – c. 1030)
 Theopemptus (c. 1035 – 1040th)
 Cyril I
 Hilarion I (1051–1054)
 Ephraim (1054/1055 – c. 1065)
 Georgius (c. 1065 – c. 1076)
 St. John II (not later than 1076/1077 – after August 1089)
 John III (summer 1090 – before 14 August 1091)
 Nicholas (c. 1093 – before 1104)
 Nicephorus I (18 December 1104 – April 1121)
 Nikita (15 October 1122 – 9 March 1126)
 Michael II (summer 1130 – 1145)
 Kliment Smoliatich (27 July 1147 – early 1155)
 St. Constantine I (1156 – 1158/1159)
 Theodore (August 1160 – June 1163)
 John IV (spring 1164 – 1166)
 Constantine II (1167 – 1169/1170)
 Michael III (spring 1171 – ?)
 Nicephorus II (before 1183 – after 1201)
 Matthew (before 1210 – 19 August 1220)
 Cyril II (1224/1225 – autumn 1233)
 Joseph (1242/1247 – ?)
 Cyril III (1242/1247 – 27 November 1281)
 St. Maximus (1283 – 6 December 1305)
 St. Peter (1308 – 21 December 1326)
 St. Theognostus (1328–1353)
 St. Alexius (1354–1378)
  (1379)
 St. Cyprian (1381–1383)
 Pimen (1382 – 1384)
 St. Dionysius (1383–1385)
 St. Cyprian (1390–1406 restored)
 St. Photius (1408–1431)
 Gerasimus (1433–1435)
 Isidore (1437–1441)

In 1441, Metropolitan Isidore of Moscow embraced the Union of Florence which briefly healed the Great Schism by re-uniting various Eastern Catholic Churches with the Holy See. Under pressure from Vasily II, princes of the Grand Duchy of Moscow denounced the union with Rome and imprisoned Isidore in the Chudov Monastery for two years.  The metropolitan see lay vacant for seven years. In 1448, the secular authorities appointed Jonah of Moscow as metropolitan since Isidore was adjudged to have apostatized to Catholicism.  Like his immediate predecessors, he permanently resided in Moscow, and was the last Moscow-based primate of the metropolis to keep the traditional title with reference to the metropolitan city of Kiev. He was also the first metropolitan in Moscow to be appointed without the approval of the Ecumenical Patriarch of Constantinople as had been the norm. Some time after his appointment, Jonah unilaterally changed his title to "Metropolitan of Moscow and all Rus' " which was a de facto declaration of independence of the Church in north-eastern Rus' from the Patriarchate of Constantinople.

Metropolitan of Moscow and all Russia 
 Jonah (1448–1461)
 Theodosius (3 May 1461 – 13 September 1464)
 Philip I (11 November 1464 – 5 April 1473)
 St. Gerontius (29 June 1473 – 28 May 1489)
 Zosimus (26 September 1490 – 9 February 1495)
 Simon (22 September 1495 – 30 April 1511)
 Barlaam (3 August 1511 – 18 December 1521)
 Daniel (27 February 1522 – 2 February 1539)
 St. Joasaphus (6 February 1539 – January 1542)
 St. Macarius (19 March 1542 – 31 December 1563)
 Athanasius (5 March 1564 – 16 May 1566)
 Herman (July 1566)
 St. Philip II (25 July 1566 – 4 November 1568)
 Cyril IV (11 November 1568 – 8 February 1572)
 Anthony (May 1572 – early 1581)
 Dionisyus (1581 – 13 October 1586)
 Job (11 December 1586 – 23 January 1589)

Patriarch of Moscow and all Rus

First Patriarchial Period (1589—1721)

Procurators of the Most Holy Synod
The Ober-Procurator (Attorney-General) was a non-clerical officer who headed the Most Holy Synod from 1722 to 1917.

 Ivan Vasilyevich Boltin (19 June 1722 – 11 May 1725)
 From 1726 to 31 December 1741 the office procurator was vacant.
 Aleksey Petrovich Baskakov (11 May 1725 – 2 December 1730)
 Guardian Captain Rayevsky (14 Jule 1726 as "procurator")
 Office vacant until 1740
 Nikita Semyonovich Krechetnikov (3 November 1740 – 1741)
 Yakov Petrovich Shakhovskoy (31 December 1741 – 29 March 1753)
 Afanasy Ivanovich Lvov (18 December 1753 – 17 April 1758)
 Aleksey Semyonovich Kozlovsky (17 April 1758 – 9 June 1763)
 Ivan Ivanovich Melissino (10 June 1763 – 24 October 1768)
 Pyotr Petrovich Chebyshyov (24 October 1768 – 7 May 1774)
 Sergey Vasilyevich Akchurin (12 May 1774 – 28 July 1786)
 Apollos Ivanovich Naumov (28 July 1786 – 26 July 1791)
 Count Aleksey Ivanovich Musin-Pushkin (1791–1797)
 Prince Vasily Alekseyevich Khovansky (1797–1799)
 Count Dmitry Ivanovich Khvostov (1799–1802)
 Aleksandr Alekseyevich Yakovlev (31 December 1802 – 7 October 1803)
 Prince Aleksandr Nikolayevich Golitsyn (21 October 1803 – 24 October or 19 November 1817)
 Prince Pyotr Sergeyevich Meshchersky (24 November 1817 – 2 April 1833)
 Stepan Dmitriyevich Nechayev (1833 – 25 June 1836)
 Count Nikolay Aleksandrovich Protasov (24 February 1836 – 16 January 1855)
 Aleksandr Ivanovich Karasevsky (25 December 1855 – 20 September 1856)
 Count Aleksandr Petrovich Tolstoy (20 September 1856 – 28 February 1862)
 Aleksey Petrovich Akhmatov (March 1862 – June 1865)
 Count Dmitry Andreyevich Tolstoy (23 June 1865 – 23 April 1880)
 Konstantin Petrovich Pobedonostsev (24 April 1880 – 19 October 1905)
 Prince Aleksey Dmitriyevich Obolensky (20 October 1905 – 4 April 1906)
 Prince Aleksey Aleksandrovich Shirinsky-Shikhmatov (26 April – 9 July 1906)
 Pyotr Petrovich Izvolsky (27 July 1906 – 5 February 1909)
 Sergey Mikhailovich Lukyanov (5 February 1909 – 2 May 1911)
 Vladimir Karlovich Sabler (2 May 1911 – 4 July 1915)
 Aleksandr Dmitriyevich Samarin (5 July 1915 – 26 September 1915)
 Aleksandr Nikolayevich Volzhin (1 October 1915 – 7 August 1916)
 Nikolay Pavlovich Rayev (30 August 1916 – 3 March 1917)
 Vladimir Nikolayevich Lvov (3 March 1917 – 24 July 1917)
 Anton Vladimirovich Kartashyov (25 July – 5 August 1917).

Second Patriarchial Period (since 1917)

Notes

References

External links
Chronological list of Patriarchs of the Russian Orthodox Church 

History of the Russian Orthodox Church
Eastern Orthodoxy in medieval Russia